Qaralar-e Lotfollah (also Romanized as Qarālar-e Loţfollāh; also known as Qarālar-e Loţfollāh Beyg) is a village in Nazluy-ye Jonubi Rural District, in the Central District of Urmia County, West Azerbaijan Province, Iran. At the 2006 census, its population was 87, in 29 families.

References 

Populated places in Urmia County